Grumpy Old Men is a 1993 American romantic comedy film directed by Donald Petrie, written by Mark Steven Johnson, and starring Jack Lemmon, Walter Matthau, Ann-Margret, Burgess Meredith, Daryl Hannah, Kevin Pollak, Ossie Davis and Buck Henry. It is followed by the sequel film Grumpier Old Men.

Plot

In Wabasha, Minnesota, retirees John Gustafson and Max Goldman are feuding next-door neighbors. Living alone, they spend their time ice fishing, trading insults, and pulling cruel practical jokes on each other, including John leaving a dead fish in Max's truck. Their rivalry irritates their friend Chuck, owner of the town bait shop, and Max's son Jacob, who is running for mayor. Dodging the attempts of IRS Agent Elliot Snyder to collect a serious debt, John supports his daughter Melanie when she separates from her husband Mike.

John and Max both find themselves attracted to Ariel Truax, a free-spirited English professor who moves in across the street. Chuck has Thanksgiving dinner with Ariel, prompting John and Max to compete for her affections. Chuck dies, and Max discovers John's IRS debt. John spends time with Ariel, revealing that he and Max used to be childhood friends. John and Ariel have sex – his first time since 1978 – and a jealous Max drives John's fishing shanty onto thin ice, which John narrowly escapes. He confronts Max, and the source of their animosity is revealed: Max resents John for marrying Max's high school sweetheart. John explains she was unfaithful and Max was happier with the woman he did marry, but Max reminds John that he will have nothing to offer Ariel once the IRS takes his house. With this on his mind, John ends his relationship with Ariel. Ariel then gives John advice, warning him that he will regret the risks he did not take in life.

Jacob is elected mayor, and Max continues courting Ariel. On Christmas, Melanie comes to visit and John is upset to learn she has reconciled with Mike. Giving Melanie the same warning Ariel gave him, he warns that she will regret the risks she did not take in life, and then John leaves for the local bar. At Melanie's request, Jacob asks Max to settle things with John, but the fathers are unable to mend their dispute and John storms out of the bar. Max soon follows and finds John in the snow, having suffered a heart attack. At the hospital, Max checks in by declaring he is John's friend. He tells Ariel what happened, and she reconciles with John as he recovers.

Max tries to resolve John's debt, but the unsympathetic Agent Snyder prepares to sell John's house and possessions. Barricading the house, Max leaves a fish in Snyder's car and buries him in snow, while Jacob manages to temporarily block the property's seizure. Spring arrives, and John and Ariel get married. As a wedding gift, Max informs John that he and Jacob have paid off the debt. The newlyweds drive off, but not before John finds Max has left a fish in the wedding limo car. Max leaves to find a date of his own, as Jacob and an officially divorced Melanie begin a new romance with each other.

Cast
Jack Lemmon as John Gustafson Jr.
Walter Matthau as Max Goldman
Ann-Margret as Ariel Truax
Burgess Meredith as John Gustafson Sr.
Daryl Hannah as Melanie Gustafson
Kevin Pollak as Jacob Goldman
Ossie Davis as Chuck (Bait Shop Owner)
Buck Henry as Elliott Snyder (IRS Agent)
Christopher McDonald as Mike
Steve Cochran as Weatherman
Joe Howard as Phil (Pharmacist)

Production
The screenplay of Grumpy Old Men was written by Mark Steven Johnson, a film student at Winona State University (Minnesota). John Davis and Richard C. Berman pitched Johnson's script to Bill Gerber. Johnson envisioned the screenplay to star Jack Lemmon, Walter Matthau, and Sophia Loren. Matthau was initially hesitant to accept the role but was convinced by Lemmon and his son Charles Matthau. Ann-Margret was cast as the love interest, but Loren would be cast in the sequel. During pre-production the script was also rewritten to be more comedic than originally envisioned.

The cast and crew arrived in Minnesota in January 1993 but had to wait to start shooting until February 2 because of a lack of snowfall. Interior scenes were filmed at the Paisley Park Studios while St. Paul, Faribault, and Center City doubled as Wabasha. The ice-shanty scenes were shot on Lake Rebecca. Filming wrapped on June 23, 1993, after a delay of several months when Matthau contracted pneumonia while filming a fight scene with Lemmon in subzero temperatures.

Release
Grumpy Old Men was one of the biggest surprise hits of the year at the time of its release. The film opened on December 25, 1993, with a weekend gross of $3,874,911. However, its numbers gradually became stronger, grossing $70 million in the United States and Canada, well above its budget of $35 million. The film was released in the United Kingdom on May 27, 1994. It grossed $10.4 million internationally for a worldwide total of $80.5 million.

Critical reaction
On review aggregator Rotten Tomatoes the film has an approval rating of 64% based on 44 reviews, with a rating average of 5.8/10. The site's consensus reads, "Grumpy Old Men's stars are better than the material they're given -- but their comedic chemistry is so strong that whenever they share the screen, it hardly matters". On  Metacritic, which assigns a weighted average rating to reviews, the film has a score of 53 out of 100, based on 16 critics, indicating "mixed or average reviews". Audiences polled by CinemaScore gave the film an average grade of "A" on an A+ to F scale.

Caryn James of The New York Times called the film "the kind of holiday movie a lot of people are searching for." She went on to explain that this is because "It's cheerful, it's well under two hours and it doesn't concern any major social blights, unless you think Jack Lemmon tossing a dead fish into Walter Matthau's car is cause for alarm."

Despite rating it with two stars out of four, and giving it a mixed review about the film's credibility and diction, Roger Ebert of the Chicago Sun-Times concluded his review by saying that "Matthau and Lemmon are fun to see together, if for no other reason than just for the essence of their beings."

Peter Rainer of the Los Angeles Times said, "Watching Jack Lemmon and Walter Matthau sparring with each other in Grumpy Old Men is like watching an old vaudeville routine for the umpteenth time." Rainer added, "They play off their tics and wheezes with the practiced ease of old pros but there's something a bit too chummy and self-congratulatory about it all."

American Film Institute recognition:
AFI's 100 Years... 100 Laughs – Nominated

Home media
Grumpy Old Men was first released on DVD on June 25, 1997. On August 22, 2006, the film was made available in a DVD "Double Feature" pack along with its sequel Grumpier Old Men. On July 7, 2009, the film was made available by itself on Blu-ray. The "Double Feature" pack was later released onto Blu-ray on February 23, 2010. The Blu-ray releases marked the first time both films have been available in widescreen since the LaserDisc releases. None of the Blu-ray releases contain any special features.

Sequel
A sequel, entitled Grumpier Old Men, was released in 1995, with Lemmon, Matthau, Meredith and Ann-Margret reprising their roles, and Mark Steven Johnson writing the script.

A Prequel 
[Younger and Grumpier then Ever] was released in 2023 with Anthony Rowe playing the Role of Max Goldman and Clint Irwin Playing The Role of John Gustafson

References

External links

 
 
 
 
 Grumpy Old Men at Rotten Tomatoes

1993 romantic comedy films
1993 films
American buddy comedy films
American romantic comedy films
Davis Entertainment films
1990s buddy comedy films
1990s English-language films
Films about old age
Films directed by Donald Petrie
Films produced by John Davis
Films scored by Alan Silvestri
Films set in Minnesota
Films shot in Minnesota
Films with screenplays by Mark Steven Johnson
Warner Bros. films
1990s American films